Li Ju (born 10 January 2002) is a Chinese footballer currently playing as a midfielder for Beijing Guoan.

Club career
Li Ju was promoted to the senior team of Beijing Guoan within the 2021 Chinese Super League season. He would be given an opportunity to participate within senior games when he was part of the AFC Champions League squad, which was a mix of reserves and youth players to participate within centralized venues while the clubs senior players were still dealing with self-isolating measures due to COVID-19. He would make his debut in a AFC Champions League game on 8 July 2021 against Daegu FC in a 3-0 defeat.

Career statistics
.

References

External links

2002 births
Living people
Chinese footballers
Association football midfielders
Beijing Guoan F.C. players